Arev Petrosyan (born May 6, 1972 in Yerevan), is an Armenian artist. Honored artist of the Republic of Armenia (2015).

Biography

Arev (Arevik) Petrosyan was born on May 6, 1972 in Yerevan, Armenia, in the family of the sculptor Benik Petrosyan and violinist, pedagogue, public figure Alice Adamyan.

1987-1991 Arev studied at Panos Terlemezyan College of Fine Arts in the faculty of design, 1991-1995 she studied Computer Graphics and “Management and administration” and in 1991-1998 she was enrolled in the Yerevan State Academy of Arts (faculty of ceramics, art). In 1999 Arev became a member of the Artists' Union of Armenia. In 2014 she donated her artwork “LOVE” to the AIWA organization in San Francisco. In 2013 Arev was included in “Women in Art” volume 1 series of book From Middle Ages to the Modern Art Era. In 2014 Arev Petrosyan's 8,40 x 2,40 meters art work was presented and donated to Holy Trinity Church in Fresno for 100 Year Anniversary of the first Armenian church in United States. In 2015 Arev opened AREV ART GALLERY in the center of Yerevan. In 2015 she was awarded as an honored artist of Republic of Armenia. 

During the period of 1995-2007 Arev has designed number of television studios upon order of the Armenian National 
television Company as well as other agencies and television companies–the second channel, “Kaym”, “Paradise”, “Yerkir Media”, “Sharm”, “Shant”, “Shoghakat”, “Internews”, “A1+’’, “AR’’. She designed the information pavilions of the Government of Armenia, Ministry of Jurisdiction, “City FM” radio station. Worked with famous companies as iCon Communication, Schwarzkoph, Coca-Cola. Aesthetic design of television movies “New Year”. She has been the art director in the film “Path” (directed by Ruben Qochar, USA-Armenia). She has done stage design for concerts, staging, different occasions, interior and exterior design of cottages, offices, restaurants, apartments and places.

 Honored Artist of the RA
 Member of the Artists’ Union of the RA
 CEO of “Benik Petrosyan” cultural fund (1997)
 Founder of Arev Art Gallery (2015)

Founder of “NOOSH AREVI”  Armenian brand of clothing, bags, scarfs and assessors, home deco and  furniture production based on national heritage, which will be launched in spring 2018.

2007-2017 donated artworks for charity “ORRAN” organization, she is one of GOLD donators.

AREV ART GALLERY
In 2015 opened AREV ART GALLERY in the center of Yerevan. Along with Arev's work, on display are her brother - Areg Petrosyan's sculptures, as well as her late father Benik Petrosyan's masterpieces. 

This art center became a favorite place for residents of Yerevan and its guests. Being famous public person, she is connecting people and bringing to life cultural events and social projects

Exhibitions
 Exhibition at American University of Armenia /AUA/ within “Empowerment of Girls and Women  in   Armenia” conference, 2017 
 Exhibition at German Embassy in Armenia dedicated to women, 2017 
 “Armenian culture week” in Tokyo, 2016 
 “Women's role in sustainable development” in Paris in UNESCO house, 2016
 Arev Petrosyan for American University of Armenia (AUA), 2015
 Beirut Art Fair 2014. GALA ART GALLERY's booth, 2014
 Monaco Art Fair 2014 SHEDEVR Art GALLERY's booth, 2014
 Holy Trinity Armenian Church in Fresno, Exhibition and donation of two paintings to the church, 2013
 Council of Europe, Strasbourg - stained glass picture “Power of Unity” which was put on display at the Assembly Hall, 2013
 Exhibition of triptych “Power of Unity” at the hall of the Ministerial Committee, 2013
 Exhibition in Belarus, Armenian days in Minsk, 2013
 Exhibition of triptych in National Gallery of Armenia “BOOK 500”, 2012
 “Woman in Art” exhibition in Artists' Union of Armenia, 2012
 Woman Business Forum, 2012
 Exhibition in Beirut, 2012
 Exhibition in Armenian Consulate, Los Angeles, USA, 2012
 Project “Genocide 100”. Pray (AXOTQ), 2011
 Opening of “Arev Art Show Room” in Moscow, 2011
 “Colors from Armenia”, Beirut, 2011
 Exhibition at the National Assembly of the Republic of Armenia, Yerevan, 2010
 Armenian days in Georgia, Tbilisi, 2010
 American University of Armenia (AUA), 2010
 Exhibition in American Embassy, Yerevan, 2010
 Exhibition & Presentation of Catalogue and DVD “Reflection and Looking, 2009
 “My golden city” dedicated to the 2790th anniversary of Yerevan, Artists' Union of Armenia, 2008
 “Dedication” to the memory of Arev Petrosyan's father sculptor Benik Petrosyan, National Gallery of Armenia (family exhibition)Yerevan, 2008 
 The Third Beijing International Art Biennale, China, 2008
 75th Anniversary of the Union of Painters of Armenia, Artists' Union of Armenia, Yerevan, 2008
 III forum of artistic and scientific clerisy of CIS countries, Tajikistan, Dushanbe, 2008
 “March 8th - International Women's day” by the patronage of the First Lady of the Republic of Armenia, Yerevan, 2007
 Exhibitions National Assembly of the Republic of Armenia, Yerevan, 2006
 “Woman Painters of Armenia”, Hamazgayin, Yerevan, 2006
 “Women's Art” The Ministry of Foreign Affairs of the Republic of Armenia, 2005
 AOKS, Yerevan, Armenia, 2005
 “My Flowers to the Martyrs” dedicated to the 90th anniversary of the Armenian, 2005
 “Women for peace” UNIFEM, Yerevan (was awarded a prize), 2002
 United Nations office, Yerevan, 2001
 UNESCO student camps, Yerevan, 1999
 Number of exhibitions in the Republic of Armenian, also foreign exhibitions, 1991-1995

Gallery

See also
List of Armenian artists
List of Armenians
Culture of Armenia

References

External links
 Official web page
 Gorgeous woman creates magnificent works of art
 Arev Petrosyan
 My Library, Arev Petrosyan
 Gala Art Gallery, Arev Petrosyan
 Մերոնք Արև Պետրոսյան
 Arev Petrosyan
 Բարև, ես եմ Արև Պետրոսյան 19 06 17
 Arev Art Gallery - Արև Պետրոսյան Ցուցասրահ
 Художники по стеклу. Аревик Бениковна Петросян
 Arev Petrosyan

1972 births
Armenian painters
Living people
Artists from Yerevan